Charlie Reynolds (Born April 30, 1971) is an American politician who has served as a Delegate from the 4th district to the West Virginia House of Delegates since 2020. Reynolds is a Republican.

Early life, education, and career
Reynolds is the son of Charles Foster Reynolds Sr. and Ruth Ann Reynolds. He received his high school diploma from John Marshall High School. Reynolds worked as a railroad terminal manager before seeking public office.

Elections
Reynolds announced his candidacy in 2020, with no prior experience in law or politics. He received the endorsement of the West Virginia Business and Industry Council. Reynolds won unopposed in his primary election.

In a three-way, vote-for-two general election, Reynolds received 35.69% of the vote.

Tenure

Committee assignments
Energy and Manufacturing
Government Organization
Veterans Affairs and Homeland Security
Workforce Development

Gun Rights
Reynolds is a self-described "gun guy" and a member of the NRA. In the House of Delegates, he was the lead sponsor of HB 2739, a bill that would declare West Virginia a Second Amendment "sanctuary state."

Personal life
Reynolds is married to Nicole Lee Reynolds, a classroom aide, at his alma mater, and has two children. Reynolds is a Christian.

References

1971 births
21st-century American politicians
Living people
West Virginia Republicans